Hagenbach  may refer to:

 Hagenbach, a town in Rhineland-Palatinate, Germany, seat of the Verbandsgemeinde
 Hagenbach (Verbandsgemeinde), a Verbandsgemeinde ("collective municipality") in Rhineland-Palatinate, Germany
 Hagenbach, Haut-Rhin, a commune in the Haut-Rhin department in Alsace in France
 Hagenbach (Hassel), a river of Saxony-Anhalt, Germany
 Hagenbach (river), a river of North Rhine-Westphalia, Germany
 Hagenbach (surname)